Pattersonville may refer to:
Pattersonville, Iowa, a former name for Hull, Iowa
Pattersonville, Louisiana, which was incorporated in 1907 as the Town of Patterson, Louisiana
Pattersonville, New York
Pattersonville, Pennsylvania, see List of places in Pennsylvania: Pa–Pi